Solagran Limited is an Australian pharmaceutical company which has developed a range of biologically active therapeutic substances derived from the live elements of the green needles of certain species of conifer tree known as Bioeffectives.

History
Solagran brings together a significant history . Research into Bioeffectives has been undertaken for a period of approximately 80 years involving more than 3.5 million PhD. and DSc. research hours (encompassing 74 PhD.s and 80 DSc.s), making it arguably the most substantial botanicals research program ever undertaken. The extent of the effort is evidenced by the fact that the company's intellectual property encompasses 22 patents .

The Bioeffectives story began in Russia in the early 1930s. Intrigued by the vitality of conifer trees that remain disease free in temperature extremes ranging from ± 40 degrees Celsius, and in daylight of between 2 and 22 hours per day, a scientific team at the St Petersburg Forest Technical Academy began its investigation into the composition of the conifer tree needles. They discovered that, in conifer trees just as in our own bodies, specific combinations of compounds are responsible for health and vital functions.

During World War II, a precursor to Bioeffective A, one of the company's Bioeffectives, was approved by the Russian Surgeon General for use by the military and civilian population as a multivitamin, anti-bacterial wound-healing substance. According to Solagran, it also helped save many lives during the 900-day siege of Leningrad (now St Petersburg).

Over the following decades, new products were developed and trialled in leading Russian and European institutions for medical, cosmetic, agricultural and veterinary applications. Between 1950 and 1975, several Bioeffectives were entered into the Russian Pharmacopoeia and used on a national scale. Bioeffectives were also used with great success to treat people exposed to radiation as a result of the Chernobyl disaster.

In 1990, one of the leaders of the research effort in the Soviet Union, Dr Vagif Soultanov, now Executive Chairman of Solagran, went to Australia to work at their Government's peak scientific body, Commonwealth Scientific and Industrial Research Organisation, as part of an inter-government scientific exchange programme.

In 1995, the Australian company Solagran was formed to fund the ongoing R&D effort. In 1998, ownership of all intellectual property associated with Bioeffectives was transferred to Solagran. After over three decades of working in the pharmaceutical industry Solagrans managing director gave his position to his brother in-law after the passing of his wife.

The company listed on the Australian Securities Exchange in 2003. Since then, in conjunction with the St Petersburg Forest Technical Academy, Solagran has completed a large number of pre-clinical and clinical trials.

Ownership
Solagran was a public company. Its shares are widely owned.

Solagran (stock code:SLA) was listed on the ASX. Its securities were also traded on the Frankfurt Stock Exchange (stock code: SLA.F).

Activity and Medical Conditions
In contrast to conventional pharmaceuticals, Bioeffectives display multifaceted therapeutic activity. To date, successful clinical trials have been conducted with respect to a number of medical conditions including liver diseases, neurological disorders, gastrointestinal problems, and colds and flu, to name just a few.

The efficacious nature of Bioeffectives is at odds with conventional medicine. Mainstream pharmacology dictates that the active ingredient should be a single molecule, or small number of molecules. Side-effects are an accepted consequence of potency. In fact, pharmacologists speak of efficacy to side-effect ratios. The fact that Bioeffectives display such a high degree of efficacy, while causing few if any side-effects, is anathema to the industry.

Bioeffectives variously contain compounds known as polyprenols, long-chain isoprenoid alcohols that play a vital role in cell metabolism. Polyprenols are similar to compounds found in the cells of humans and animals known as dolichols. Research indicates that ingested polyprenols are metabolised by human and animal liver into dolichols which then take part in the dolichol phosphate cycle, which is why Bioeffectives are so easily assimilated by humans and animals, and have such high efficacy and low toxicity.

The isolation of Bioeffectives involves patented extraction technology. The process uses a soft extraction procedure that enables the polyprenols to be extracted without destroying their biologically active properties.

Manufacturing
The manufacture of Bioeffectives is a key component of Solagran's intellectual property.

Solagran products are manufactured by SibEX, a specialist manufacturer of plant-based extracts headquartered in Tomsk in central Siberia. The facility is the world's first and, at this stage, only commercial polyprenols manufacturing facility .

Products
The following Solagran products are commercialised:

Ropren
Ropren has been the subject of extensive trials to determine its efficacy and safety in the treatment of liver disease . In 2007, Ropren was approved by the Russian Ministry of Health for entry into the Russian Pharmacopoeia as an effective treatment for liver disease. As such, it is the only natural medication of Russian origin to be registered in Russia for over 20 years.

The trials in Russia also showed that Ropren had wider application than liver disease. This included the ability to normalise immune response and normalise cholesterol levels, as well as alleviate the symptoms of neurodegenerative disorders (including Alzheimer's disease, Parkinson's disease), alcoholism , drug addiction and depression. A trial conducted at the Brain Sciences Institute at Swinburne University in Melbourne, Australia, reported in 2006, confirmed certain neurocognitive effects of Ropren identified previously in Russia .

Solagran was awarded a Manufacturing License in 2008 . In January 2010, the company received from the Russian Health Control Authority a Pharmaceutical Wholesale Distribution License. Commercial sales of Ropren in Russia for the treatment of a number of liver diseases commenced in February 2010 .

Bioeffective A
Approximately 50 human clinical trials in relation to Bioeffective A have so far been conducted in Russia at various prestigious scientific institutions including the St. Petersburg S.M. Kirov Military Medical Academy and the St. Petersburg Scientific Research Institute of Radiation Hygiene.

No side-effects from the use of Bioeffective A were evident, except for six cases of individual intolerance when it was applied topically in concentrations well above that required for therapeutic efficacy to elicit an adverse reaction.

A 2006 review by Dr Vladimir G. Bespalov of the N.N. Petrov State Scientific Institute of Oncology presented the results of studies of CGNC and CGNC-based products as used in various fields of medicine.

Bioeffective A has been listed on the Australian Register of Therapeutic Goods since 2006 .

Current major studies into Bioeffective A are being undertaken in conjunction with:
N.N. Petrov State Scientific Institute of Oncology at the Russian Ministry of Health in St. Petersburg
Skvortsova-Stephanova Psychiatric Hospital in St. Petersburg
Pasteur Institute in St. Petersburg

In conjunction with both the Pasteur Institute and the N.N. Petrov Institute of Oncology, Solagran is currently undertaking a series of phased multi-centre clinical trials aimed at achieving full pharmaceutical registration of Bioeffective A in Europe.

Bioeffective A has been available for purchase and use in both Australia and New Zealand since 2007 as Bioeffective A 320 capsules.

External links
http://www.solagran.com/
SYNERGY SCIENCE: Solagran and Bioeffectives

References

Solagran Limited. Annual Report 2009
Solagran Limited. Annual Report 2008
Solagran Limited. Annual Report 2007
Solagran Limited. Annual Report 2006
RM Research Pty Ltd. Solagran Limited research report (October 2007)

Pharmaceutical companies of Australia
Pharmaceutical companies established in 1995